Ere is an Austronesian language spoken on the south coast of Manus Island in Papua New Guinea.

References

External links 
 A recording of Ere language and printed notes are available through Kaipuleohone. 

Manus languages
Languages of Manus Province